A self mounting image is a disk image format, commonly found on the classic Mac OS platform, that is encapsulated in an application that mounts it as a file system. When downloaded from the Internet, they are often in a BIN, BinHex or StuffIt file. Despite being an application, they often have a  file extension. Disk Copy, the application commonly used to handle disk images in the classic Mac OS was an optional program not part of the standard installation.

Self mounting images have fallen out of favor with the arrival of Mac OS X. All copies of Mac OS X have DiskImageMounter, the utility for mounting disk images.

Macintosh-only software
Disk images